Jonathan Matthew Poirier, better known by his stage name JDiggz, is a Canadian hip hop MC and producer of Guyanese and French Canadian descent. He is also one half of the StarBwoyz production Team.

Career
In 2005, Diggz was recruited to be a support act for Aftermath/G-Unit recording artist Game for his National Canadian Tour (18 Cities). In 2007, JDiggz released Memoirs of a Playbwoy, featuring the singles "Puush It Up", "Make It Hot", "With You", "Gimme Dat" and "Just Wanna Party".  The album, before its release, was titled The Pornstarr EP. JDiggz is currently in the studio working on his second album entitled "The Experiment". The concept of this album is to "do whatever he wants to genre and sound wise to create the perfect project in his mind."  He is also said to have been working with Neverending White Lights frontman Daniel Victor. However, as yet, no specific details have been released other than the new song released titled This Time by JDiggz Feat: Neverending White Lights.

in 2012, JDiggz changed his stage name to 'Jonathan III' and focused on putting out music primarily online through Soundcloud and VEVO. He was formerly managed by Star Boy Records Inc. / WarnerChappell Music Inc.

JDiggz is currently retired from making music and has been focusing his career towards film production as a founder of the studio Iron Shore Films. He currently resides between Toronto and Los Angeles.

Discography

Studio albums

Singles
"Hypnotic"
"Puush It Up"
"Make It Hot"
"Gimme Dat"
"Just Wanna Party" feat. Voyce
"With You" feat. George)
"With You" (Remix) feat. George & Drake)
"This Time" feat. Neverending White Lights (2010)

Other collaborations
"Don't Watch Me" by Trish (feat. JDiggz)
"Pop" by Melanie Durrant (feat. JDiggz)
"Ridin'" by Nate Skeeze (feat. JDiggz)
"34 D'z" by Peezee (feat. JDiggz)
"The Game (Remix)" by Alyssa Reid (feat. JDiggz)

Production credits
"Smirnoff Raw Tea Partay" Commercial (BBH NYC) - Directed by Little x
"Pop" by Melanie Durrant (Feat. JDiggz)
"Let Me Remix" by Melanie Durrant (Feat. Kardinal Offishall)
"Head and Shoulders" by Mr. Biggaz AKA T-Trav
"Ridin'" by Nate Skeeze (Feat. JDiggz)

Awards and nominations
Nominated 2006 MMVA for MuchVibe Best Rap Video - Puush It Up
Nominated 2007 MMVA for Best Cinematography and MuchVibe Best Rap Video - Make It Hot
Nominated 2008 Juno award for Best Rap Recording - Memoirs Of A Playbwoy
Won 2011 MMVA for Independent Video of The Year- This Time

References

External links 
JDiggz Myspace Page at MySpace

1986 births
Canadian people of Guyanese descent
Canadian male rappers
Living people
Rappers from Toronto
21st-century Canadian male musicians
21st-century Canadian rappers